David Clay Bramlette III (born November 27, 1939) is a senior United States district judge of the United States District Court for the Southern District of Mississippi.

Education and career

Born in Woodville, Mississippi, Bramlette received a Bachelor of Arts degree from Princeton University in 1962 and a Juris Doctor from the University of Mississippi Law School in 1965. He was in private practice in Natchez, Mississippi from 1965 to 1991. He was a Special Circuit Judge of the Sixth Judicial District of Mississippi, from 1977 to 1979, a special chancery court judge, and a judge of the Adams County Court.

Federal judicial service

On July 26, 1991, Bramlette was nominated by President George H. W. Bush to a new seat on the United States District Court for the Southern District of Mississippi created by 104 Stat. 5089. He was confirmed by the United States Senate on November 21, 1991, and received his commission on November 25, 1991. He assumed senior status on March 20, 2006.

References

Sources
 

1939 births
Living people
Judges of the United States District Court for the Southern District of Mississippi
Mississippi state court judges
People from Woodville, Mississippi
Princeton University alumni
United States district court judges appointed by George H. W. Bush
20th-century American judges
University of Mississippi School of Law alumni
21st-century American judges